Ilya Fedotov is a Russian ice hockey left wing who plays for HC Neftekhimik Nizhnekamsk of the Kontinental Hockey League (KHL) on loan from fellow KHL club, Torpedo Nizhny Novgorod.  He played two games for Torpedo Nizhny Novgorod during the 2020–21 season. He was drafted by the Arizona Coyotes in the 2nd round of the 2021 NHL Entry Draft with the 43rd overall pick in the draft.

References

External links
 

2003 births
Living people
Arizona Coyotes draft picks
HC Neftekhimik Nizhnekamsk players
Russian ice hockey left wingers
Sportspeople from Saratov
Torpedo Nizhny Novgorod players